Surangapur is a village in the Naoda CD block in the Berhampore subdivision of Murshidabad district in the state of West Bengal, India.

Geography

Location

Area overview
The area shown in the map alongside, covering Berhampore and Kandi subdivisions, is spread across both the natural physiographic regions of the district, Rarh and Bagri. The headquarters of Murshidabad district, Berhampore, is in this area. The entire area is overwhelmingly rural with over 80% of the population living in the rural areas.

Note: The map alongside presents some of the notable locations in the subdivisions. All places marked in the map are linked in the larger full screen map.

Demographics
According to the 2011 Census of India, Surangapur had a total population of 6,343, of which 3,251 (51%) were males and 3,092 (49%) were females. Population in the age range 0-6 years was 596. The total number of literates in Surangapur was 4,362 (75.90% of the population over 6 years).

Civic administration

CD block HQ
The headquarters of Naoda CD block are located at Surangapur.

References

Villages in Murshidabad district